Allen Township is a township in Northampton County, Pennsylvania. The population of Allen Township was 4,269 at the 2010 census. Allen Township is part of the Lehigh Valley metropolitan area, which had a population of 861,899 and was the 68th most populous metropolitan area in the U.S. as of the 2020 census.

History
The Kreidersville Covered Bridge was added to the National Register of Historic Places in 1980.

Geography
It is drained by the Lehigh River, via the Catasauqua Creek, which separates it from Lehigh County. Its villages include Howertown, Kreidersville, Seemsville (also in East Allen Township,) and Weaversville (also in East Allen Township.)

Neighboring municipalities
Lehigh Township (north)
Moore Township (northeast)
East Allen Township (east)
Hanover Township, Lehigh County (south)
Catasauqua, Lehigh County (tangent to the south)
North Catasauqua (southwest)
Northampton (west)
Whitehall Township, Lehigh County (tangent to the west)
North Whitehall Township, Lehigh County (west)

Transportation

Pennsylvania Route 329 is the only numbered highway traversing Allen Township. It follows an east-west alignment through the central portion of the township. Other local roads of note include Bullshead Road, Cherryville Road, Howertown Road/Weaversville Road, Indian Trail Road, Kreidersville Road, Old Carriage Road, Seemsville Road, and Willowbrook Road.

Demographics

As of the census of 2000, there were 2,630 people, 1,001 households, and 805 families residing in the township.  The population density was 237.1 people per square mile (91.6/km2).  There were 1,030 housing units at an average density of 92.9/sq mi (35.9/km2).  The racial makeup of the township was 98.67% White, 0.19% African American, 0.08% Native American, 0.08% Asian, 0.04% Pacific Islander, 0.42% from other races, and 0.53% from two or more races. Hispanic or Latino of any race were 1.10% of the population.

There were 1,001 households, out of which 31.2% had children under the age of 18 living with them, 70.7% were married couples living together, 5.6% had a female householder with no husband present, and 19.5% were non-families. 14.7% of all households were made up of individuals, and 5.7% had someone living alone who was 65 years of age or older.  The average household size was 2.63 and the average family size was 2.91.

In the township, the population was spread out, with 21.7% under the age of 18, 6.3% from 18 to 24, 27.5% from 25 to 44, 31.2% from 45 to 64, and 13.3% who were 65 years of age or older.  The median age was 42 years. For every 100 females, there were 97.4 males.  For every 100 females age 18 and over, there were 98.3 males.

The median income for a household in the township was $54,464, and the median income for a family was $59,702. Males had a median income of $41,219 versus $27,930 for females. The per capita income for the township was $23,859.  About 1.1% of families and 1.7% of the population were below the poverty line, including 1.6% of those under age 18 and 1.4% of those age 65 or over.

Public education 
The Township is served by the Northampton Area School District. Students in grades nine through 12 attend Northampton Area High School in Northampton.

Notable people

Henry C. Longnecker (1820-1871), born in Allen Township, former United States Congressman from Pennsylvania.
Rev. John Rosbrugh (1714-1777), Presbyterian minister of the First Presbyterian Church of Allen Township, "Clerical Martyr of the Revolutionary War". First US Army chaplain to be killed in battle, died at the Second Battle of Trenton, Feb. 2, 1777.
George Wolf (1777-1840), born in Allen Township, seventh Governor of Pennsylvania from 1829 to 1835.

References

External links

Allen Township official website

Townships in Northampton County, Pennsylvania
Townships in Pennsylvania